is a Japanese singer-songwriter.

Career 
Tanimura set up the musical group Alice together with Takao Horiuchi in 1971 and released his first extended play musical album in the following year. Alice produced its first album two years later. During this time, Tanimura also composed several musical pieces for other singers, such as Momoe Yamaguchi. In 1981, he held concerts in places such as Hong Kong, South Korea, Singapore, Thailand and Beijing. He also made recordings on the Japanese division of the Casablanca Records label.

References

External links 
 

1948 births
Living people
Musicians from Osaka
Japanese male singer-songwriters
Japanese singer-songwriters
Recipients of the Medal with Purple Ribbon